The Emilia-Romagna regional election of 1990 took place on 6 and 7 May 1990.

Events
The Italian Communist Party was by far the largest party.

After the election Enrico Boselli, regional leader of the Italian Socialist Party, formed a government comprising the Communists and the Italian Democratic Socialist Party.

In 1994 Boselli, who had been elected to the Parliament of Italy, was replaced by Pier Luigi Bersani of the Democratic Party of the Left, the successor party of the Communists.

Results

1990 elections in Italy
1990 regional election
1990
May 1990 events in Europe